Land of the Silver Fox is a 1928 American adventure film directed by Ray Enright and written by Howard Smith and Joseph Jackson. The film stars Rin Tin Tin, Leila Hyams, John Miljan, Carroll Nye, Tom Santschi, and Neola May. The film was released by Warner Bros. on October 18, 1928. As was common that year, Land of the Silver Fox was released in both silent and sound versions.

Cast
Rin Tin Tin as Rinty
Leila Hyams as Marie du Fronque
John Miljan as James Crawford
Carroll Nye as Carroll Blackton
Tom Santschi as Butch Nelson
Neola May as The Squaw 
Nanette the Dog as Nanette

Preservation status
A print of Land of the Silver Fox is held by the George Eastman House .

See also
List of early Warner Bros. sound and talking features

References

External links

1928 films
1920s English-language films
Warner Bros. films
American adventure films
1928 adventure films
Films directed by Ray Enright
American black-and-white films
American silent feature films
Rin Tin Tin
Silent adventure films
1920s American films